Peter Jeffrey Matthews (born 29 July 1942) is a  British printmaker, former teacher at Royal College of Art (RCA) and senior lecturer at Wimbledon School of Art. Educated at Ealing School of Art, Matthews went on to assist at Editions Alecto and editioned most of David Hockney's early etchings. Matthews has also exhibited his own work extensively including at the Royal Academy of Arts (RA), Royal Watercolour Society (RWS) Gallery, and with the Royal Society of Painter-Printmakers, being elected a Fellow and later Council Member 1984–98. His work is held in a number of public collections in the UK and overseas, including the Victoria & Albert Museum (V&A); British Council;the Ashmolean Museum; Albertina Museum, Vienna; Royal Library of Belgium and the Free Library, Philadelphia.

Artistic career

Employment

After graduating from Ealing School of Art, Matthews was appointed craftsman/demonstrator in the Printmaking Department at the RCA in London. He worked with many artists of that time and assisted David Hockney in editioning his early etchings 1962-1964. This included: Myself and My Heroes, Gretchen and the Snurl My Bonnie Lies over the Ocean and Kaisarion and all his Beauty. Matthews reflects on printing Hockney's Kaisarion (while he was still at Ealing) in an interview in 2011. His name is often incorrectly spelled as Peter Mathews when being credited as the printer of Hockney's etchings. In 1966, he became a Senior Lecturer in the Printmaking Department of the Wimbledon School of Art where he taught BA and MA courses in Printmaking until 1998.

Body of work

Landscape has always dominated his work. Early inspiration came from the quarries of Wales and the idea of figures in an empty pared-down landscape.  In 1971, he established a studio on the north coast of Scotland. There were no more figures, only the rocks, heather, rivers, cliffs and sea of Caithness and Sutherland. He used several plates for each etching and a wide colour palette a  

In 1991, he moved his studio to South-West France, where the landscape is in direct contrast to Scotland. The French etchings are mainly in black and white and demonstrate his fascination with time of day and shadows. Matthews ceased etching in 1998 and has returned to painting in oils informed by the landscape of the Charente.

During his 37-year career Matthews has had his work exhibited extensively in the UK and overseas both in solo and group exhibitions and his work is held in many public collections around the world.  His biography has been listed in Debrett's People of Today 1994–1998  and Who's Who of Art.

Personal life
Matthews now, after living in the Charente region of France for 11 years, resides in Woodbridge, Suffolk.

Exhibitions

Solo exhibitions
1977 Amalgam Gallery, London
1978 Galleri Unicorn, Copenhagen
1996 Foreign Press Association, London

Group exhibitions
1961 RWS Gallery, London
1964 Tib Lane Gallery
1966 “British Printmakers in the 60s”, travelling through USA with London Arts gallery
1970 AIA Gallery/Royal Institute, Glasgow
1972-7 Royal Academy Summer Exhibition
1975 Galerie Arnaud, Paris
1978 “British Contemporary Etchers”, Associated American Arts Gallery, New York
1979 “50 Years of Printmaking at the Royal College of Art”
1980-2 Scottish Print Open, Edinburgh, Dundee, Glasgow
1983 Scottish Print Open, Sweden. Norway, Finland
1983 Exhibition with La Jeune Gravure Contemporaine, Bankside Gallery, London
1985 16th Ljubljana Print Biennale, Yugoslavia (British Council invited artist)
1985 Contemporary Prints, Barbican Centre, London
1986 Grafiska Sallskapets Galleri, Stockholm, Sweden
1988 British Contemporary Art Fair
1989 Exhibition of British Prints, State Publishing Organisation, Moscow, Russia
1989 5th International Print Biennale, Bulgaria (by invitation)
1990 AD Fine Art, Barbican Centre, London
1994/5 National Print Exhibition, The Mall Galleries, London
1994 Grafica Pryzmat, Kraków, Poland
1994 Maastricht International Print Biennale, Holland
1995 Hochschule Fur Kunste, Bremen, Germany
1996 National College of Art and Design, Oslo, Norway
1996 Boxed Prints, Hardware Gallery, London
1996 New Academy Gallery, London
1996 National Gallery, Ulan Bator, Outer Mongolia
1997 Morandi Gallery, Bologna, Italy
1997 National Print Exhibition, The Mall Galleries

Public collections
Victoria and Albert Museum
Ashmolean Museum
Bibliothèque Royale, Brussels, Belgium
South London Art Gallery
Greenwich Library, London
Cheltenham Art Gallery, England
Ferens Art Gallery, Hull, England
Northampton Art Gallery, England
Southampton Art Gallery, England
Arts Council, Northern Ireland
Kings College, London
Free Library, Philadelphia, USA
Albertina Museum, Vienna, Austria
British Council
Morandi Galleria, Bologna, Italy

Education
1957–1962 Ealing School of Art, London National Diploma in Art and Design (Painting and
Printmaking)

Employment
1961 Editioning, St George’s Gallery, London
1962-4 Assisting David Hockney, Editions Alecto, London
1962-6 Royal College of Art, Craftsman- Demonstrator in Etching
1966–98 Senior Lecturer in Printmaking, Wimbledon School of Art, London
2007 Visiting Lecturer, Faculty of Fine Art, University of Yaoundé, Cameroon

Prizes
1997 Gavin Graham Award, National Print Exhibition Committees and Public Art Activities:
1974–98 Member, Edinburgh Printmakers Workshop 
1984–98 Fellow and later Council Member, Royal Society of Painter-Printmakers. Now Honorary Fellow.

References

Further reading
David Hockney, Prints. 1954–77. Midland Group/Scottish Arts Council. 1979. .
Hockney, David (1976). David Hockney by David Hockney. Thames & Hudson Ltd. .
David Hockney: The Complete Early Etchings 1961–1964. Hazlitt Holland-Hibbert and Lyndsey Ingram. .
David Hockney: Etchings and Lithographs. Thames & Hudson Ltd. 1989. 
Evening Standard David Hockney: The Complete Early Etchings, 1961–64, review: A homage to Hockney's heroes
Candid Magazine David Hockney – The Complete Early Etchings 1961–1964
Christopher Simon Sykes, Hockney: The Biography, Volume 1, Century, 2011, 
Hartley, Craig (September 1988). "David Hockney Printmaking and Technique—I". Print Quarterly. Vol.No.5 (Issue No.3): p. 242–256. Retrieved 26 July 2017.
"Anthony Dawson  - Artists' Agent". (January 1971). Arts Review Vol.XXIX (Issue No.2): p. 56-57. Retrieved 26 July 2017

1942 births
Living people
Academics of the Royal College of Art
Academics of the University of the Arts London
Alumni of Ealing Art College
British printmakers